Figure skating at the 2011 Winter Universiade included a pairs event for senior level skaters. The short program was held on February 1 and the free skating on February 2, 2011.

Results

External links
 Detailed results

Winter Universiade
Winter Universiade
Pair skating